"Fresh" is a song by the American group Kool & the Gang. Released as a single in 1984 from the album Emergency, the song peaked at #9 on the U.S. Hot 100 chart, and #11 on the UK chart. It also reached number one on both the U.S. R&B chart and U.S. Dance chart.

Chart performance

Weekly singles charts

Year-end charts

Music video
The action in the music video references the fairy tale Cinderella with the band performing the song at the ball. The two overweight women, the Ugly Sisters, are seen eating sandwiches, and a girl, Cinderella, cleaning the floor. Then suddenly Marilyn-lookalike Fairy appears and saves the day.

Track listing
12" maxi (De-Lite 881 564-1)
"Fresh" - 4:22
"Home Is Where the Heart Is" - 3:51
"Take My Heart" - 4:01

12" maxi (De-Lite 311122)
"Fresh" - 4:20
"Rollin'" - 3:11
"You Can Do It" - 4:08

7" single (De-Lite 881 564-7)
"Fresh" - 3:20
"Home Is Where the Heart Is" - 3:51

Popular culture
The song was played on the 5733rd episode of the American television soap General Hospital on August 14, 1985, when Terri (Robyn Bernard) was going wild at the bar.

Kool & the Gang themselves were featured in a 1986 television advertisement for the fast-food hamburger chain Wendy's, in which they were in a recording studio singing and dancing to the song, with lyrics slightly altered to fit the tagline, "Choose Fresh. Choose Wendy's."

In Edward Yang's 1986 film Terrorizers, the song was played in a dance club when the young woman wants to attract a man so she and a criminal gang can steal his money.

In 2021, the supermarket chain Kroger started using the song in its television commercials.

2004 version

"Fresh" was re-recorded with English-Irish pop group Liberty X in 2004, to feature on Kool & the Gang's re-recorded greatest hits compilation, The Hits: Reloaded. The new version of the song features Liberty X on vocals, with Kool & the Gang merely playing the instruments. Thus, due to the popularity of this version, it was released as a single in certain European countries on April 14, 2004. Despite its success across Europe, the single was never released in Liberty X's home country, the United Kingdom.

Background
Subsequently, "Fresh" appeared as a bonus track on the Liberty X album Being Somebody in Japan, as well as appearing on certain European editions. At the time of the single's release, the band were in a dispute with their British record label, V2 Records, and thus, it was decided that the single would not be released in the band's home country. The band's version of "Fresh" was produced by band member Tony Lundon, who also went on to produce the band's follow-up hit single, "Song 4 Lovers". Despite this, "Fresh" was regarded as one of the band's best cover versions. The track peaked at number three in Germany, number 12 in France and number 55 in Spain.

Music video
The music video for the single was recorded in late 2003, and features Liberty X playing to an audience in a club, all supported by mics and surrounded by a crowd of the group's fans. Although the video does not feature a vocal appearance from Kool & the Gang, they appear as guests inside the club, charming a woman who has arrived in search of a man. The video received a small amount of airplay on British music channels, but was often, as is with its upload to the band's official YouTube channel, credited to Liberty X featuring Kool & the Gang, whereas the official release credits the two artists the other way around.

Track listing
German CD single
 "Fresh" (Album Version) - 3:14
 "Fresh" (Bimbo Jones Remix) - 5:58

German maxi CD single
 "Fresh" (Album Version) - 3:14
 "Fresh" (Brad Gilderman Remix) - 4:12
 "Fresh" (Motivo Pop Mix) - 4:28
 "Fresh" (Bimbo Jones Remix) - 5:58

French CD single
 "Fresh" (Album Version) - 3:14
 "Fresh" (Motivo Pop Mix) - 4:28

Spanish CD single
 "Fresh" (Album Version) - 3:14
 "Fresh" (Brad Gilderman Remix) - 4:12
 "Fresh" (Motivo Pop Mix) - 4:28
 "Fresh" (Bimbo Jones Remix) - 5:58
 "Ladies Night" (featuring Sean Paul and Spanner Banner) - 3:28

Beat System version

In 1996, Beat System released their version of "Fresh", which samples the original with added vocals and rapping.

Track listing 
Maxi-CD
 "Fresh" (Radio Mix) - 3:42
 "Fresh" (Extended DJ Mix) - 5:32
 "Fresh" (Crazy Z. Version) - 3:33
 "Call My Name" - 6:08
 
Maxi-CD
 "Fresh" (Summer Mix) - 3:07
 "Fresh" (Summer Classic Club Version) - 5:05
 "Fresh" (Original Schnitzelmorph Cut) - 5:49

Charts

See also
List of number-one dance singles of 1985 (U.S.)
List of number-one R&B singles of 1985 (U.S.)

References

External links
 
 

1984 songs
1984 singles
1985 singles
1996 singles
Kool & the Gang songs
Songs written by Sandy Linzer
The Lost Fingers songs
Songs written by James "J.T." Taylor
De-Lite Records singles
V2 Records singles
Mercury Records singles
Edel AG singles
Songs written by Ronald Bell (musician)
Songs written by Claydes Charles Smith
Songs written by Robert "Kool" Bell